Raja Raja Chora is a 2021 Indian Telugu-language crime comedy film written and directed by debutant Hasith Goli. Produced by Abhishek Agarwal Arts and People Media Factory, the film stars Sree Vishnu, Megha Akash, Sunaina and Ravi Babu. The film is released on 19 August 2021.

The plot follows the protagonist, his family and others who cross his path, exploring aspects of survival in the city, crime, punishment and redemption. Raja Raja Chora received positive reviews from the critics, who were particularly appreciative of film's screenplay, background score and performances of lead actors. The film was successful at the box office.

Plot 
One night Bhaskar breaks into an unknown house and steals valuables. It is later revealed that he works at a photocopy store, where he manipulates customers and makes money without the knowledge of the owner. He lies to his girlfriend Sanjana that he works at a software company. Every time Bhaskar meets Sanjana, he dresses as a software employee. The couple plan to move to Bangalore and dream of buying their own house.

Meanwhile, Sub Inspector William Reddy, who is the uncle of Sanjana, is under pressure to curb crime in his jurisdiction and stop under-reporting cases in order to get promoted. He has an affair with Buela, wife of his close friend Madhav, and often visits Madhav’s house when the latter is away for work. Bhaskar meanwhile is revealed to have been married to Vidya, who is studying at a law school, and the couple have a son. Bhaskar and Vidya are not on good terms, and Bhaskar is still with her due to her blackmailing about leveling a cheating case. Vidya frequently demands Bhaskar to pay for her study. Eventually, Sanjana discovers that Bhaskar has a kid and Bhaskar realizes that Sanjana doesn't work as a software employee, but as a sales girl. Bhaskar lies to her that he is a widower. Fed up with living two lives, he wants to move to Bangalore with Sanjana. He plans one final heist that would settle him for life. Bhaskar frequents Anjamma’s workshop and stores his loot there. He puts on the theatrical costume of a king upon insistence from Anjamma who believes the costume brings immense wealth. He sets out for his final heist at night and burgles into the house of Madhav’s neighbour. At the same time, Madhav returns home early from a camp. William who is at Madhav’s house for his wife tries to escape. As Madhav catches William having affair with Buela, Bhaskar who is leaving from his robbery scene climbs over the wall into Madhav's house and the trio find one another at the same time.

Bhaskar is now apprehended by William after being caught in the act. Vidya who is being questioned, learns about William’s affair with Madhav’s wife and threatens William of legally assisting Madhav in pressing adultery and harassment charges if Bhaskar isn’t set free. William reluctantly agrees to release Bhaskar warning him to stop his theft. Vidya is disgusted by Bhaskar’s act of stealing later she believes that he became thief for them grows affection Raju and asks to leave the thief life, after this events Bhaskar grows fond of Vidya and ignores Sanjana. William has a new plan for Bhaskar, he forces Bhaskar to commit more robberies using the Raja costume and give him a cut in exchange for the non-involvement of police. Bhaskar complies so that he can buy a small house and move in with his wife and kid. Things take a turn when Bhaskar realises that William is planning to sensationalize the camera footages of an unknown thief in Raja costume, and later catching Bhaskar as the Raja-thief, thereby getting promoted. Knowing this, Bhaskar tells William that he wears the Raja costume for each heist because it gives him immense confidence, and advises him to use it when he requires a confidence boost for anything. William later learns about Bhaskar's affair with Sanjana, and tries to reveal to Sanjana about Bhaskar’s crimes and his marriage, but Sanjana is undeterred believing William is lying in order to get her to marry him. Angered, William approaches Vidya and claims that Bhaskar has continued his robberies despite their earlier agreement and is planning to run away with Sanjana. Later William informs Sanjana's mother about her sales girl job who she was believing her daughter working in a corporate job. Later Bhaskar is conned as he loses the entire family savings who wants to give a surprise by buying a new house for Vidya. Believing that Bhaskar is staging it, Vidya leaves him along with their kid. Sanjana also learns that Bhaskar's wife is alive much to her shock and ends their relation. Later Sanjana's  mother questions her acts and takes her to their home town. Meanwhile Bhaskar approaches Madhav in a desperate attempt to save himself from William. Madhav and the police catch William having an affair with Madhav's wife donning the King's costume. The police and media are convinced that William is the sought after thief in Raja’s costume.

Finally a famous preacher Ganapathi one of his preaching in Sri Rama Navami explains about the cheating nature how they got punished by God, we shows that Bhaskar who cheated and stole valuables for his selfish motives Finally get punished who himself conned, Sanjana having a good expertise in micro art she became fantasize in a corporate job and city life style for that she started living in a fake life filled with lies got punished after revealing the truth of Bhaskar and her dreams which became shattered, William being a responsible cop he misused his powers and cheating with his Best friend who got punished by successfully exposed in adultery and he framed himself in the Raja costume as a thief.

Now Bhaskar, regretting his past actions of crime and cheating, decides to turn himself in to atone for his mistakes. He has served his prison sentence, while Vidya is a successful lawyer and now owns a house. In the end, Bhaskar is seen going to Vidya, in the hope that she would accept him.

Cast 

 Sree Vishnu as Bhaskar
 Sunaina as Vidya, Bhaskar's wife
 Megha Akash as Sanjana
 Ravi Babu as SI William Reddy, Sanjana's uncle
 Tanikella Bharani as Ghanapati
 Srikanth Iyengar as Dr. Tirumala Rao
 Ajay Ghosh as Xerox shop Owner Subrahmanyam
 Gangavva as Anjamma
 Vasu Inturi as Madhav, William's friend
 Kadambari Kiran as Narayana, William's assistant
 Karthikeya Krishna as Lingaraju, Bhaskar's son
 Shruti Singampalli as DSP Kanakam
 Rocket Raghava as Bhaskar's brother-in-law
 Indu as Buela, Madhav's wife
 Aruna Bikshu as William's mother

Production 
Although it was officially announced in February 2020, principal photography of the film began much earlier in 2020. The script was completed in three months. In March 2020, T.G. Vishwaprasad told Deccan Chronicle that the first schedule of the film has been finished. Filming was then paused due to COVID-19 pandemic in India. It was later resumed in October 2020.

Music 

Soundtrack and score of the film is composed by Vivek Sagar, marking his second collaboration with Sree Vishnu after Brochevarevarura (2019). First single from the soundtrack – "Raja Raju Vacche" was released on 28 March 2021. The track is written by Hasith Goli and features primary vocals of Mohana Bhogaraju. It also has additional (primarily backing) vocals of Rohit Paritala, Sai Charan, Dhananjay, Lokeshwar and Sai Smaran. Second single "Maaya Maaya" was released on 12 August 2021, sung by Anurag Kulkarni and written by Sanapati Bharadwaj Patrudu. The song has features  additional (primarily backing) vocals of Yashwanth Nag, Anup Kumar Deshpande, Lakshmi Meghana, Sai Madhav, Ritesh Rao, Junaid Kumar and Shahbaaz Khan.

Release and marketing 
In early-August 2021, the film's released was announced as on 19 August 2021. The film's digital rights were sold to ZEE5 and the satellite rights were sold to Zee Telugu respectively. On 11 June 2021, a cartoon video was released, with the voice-over of Gangavva. In the video, she narrates the funny tale behind the Raja Raja Chora and how the lead character escaped from the kingdom after stealing the King's crown.

Reception

Critical reception 
The Hindu critic Sangeetha Devi Dundoo stated that: "[Raja Raja Chora] is a quirky comedy with laugh aloud segments and an emotional tale of punishment and redemption." She appreciated the performances of the cast, music, cinematography and editing, adding, "Hasith Goli joins the list of directors to watch out for in Telugu cinema." Neeshitha Nyayapati of The Times of India rated the film 3/5 and gave a more mixed review. While Nyayapati appreciated the screenplay and the narrative style, she felt that the run time was not justified.

Anji Shetty in his review for Sakshi, rated 2.75/5 and appreciated the storyline and opined that the direction could have been better. Shetty felt that Sagar's soundtrack was passable but he appreciated the background score and cinematography. A reviewer from Eenadu praised the screenplay and Vishnu's performance while adding that narrative was slow in the second half. Prakash Pecheti of Telangana Today cited that "Raja Raja Chora’ steals the show" adding that the director Hasith Goli imagined the story from a third man's perspective. And the mythological tone sets the ball rolling from the word go.

Box office 
Sakshi Post reported that the film collected a gross of ₹1.5 crore at the box office, in its opening day. In the first week, the film has grossed ₹7 crore at the box office. At the US box office, the film grossed $140,000 in the first week of its release.

References

External links 

 

Films set in Hyderabad, India
Films shot in Hyderabad, India
2020s Telugu-language films
2021 crime films
Indian crime comedy films
2021 comedy films
2021 directorial debut films